Stephen Pattison (born 1953) is a British scholar and former H. G. Wood Professor of Theology at the University of Birmingham.
He is best known for his research on practical theology, ethics, and public service management. He attended Bootham School, York and Selwyn College, Cambridge, before going on to train for ministry in the Anglican Church at Edinburgh Theological College and Edinburgh University, where he gained a PhD in Theology.

He delivered a series of Gifford Lectures in 2007 entitled "Seeing Things: From Mantelpieces to Masterpieces", later published as Seeing Things: Deepening Relations with Visual Artefacts by SCM Press.

Books
 Alive and Kicking: Towards a Practical Theology of Illness and Healing, SCM Press, 1989
 Pastoral Care and Liberation Theology, Cambridge University Press, 1994
 Medical Knowledge: Doubt and Certainty, Open University Press, 1994
 The Faith of the Managers, Cassell, 1997
 The Blackwell Reader in Pastoral and Practical Theology, With James Woodward and John Patton, Darton, Longman and Todd, 2000
 A Critique of Pastoral Care, SCM Press, 2000
 Shame: Theory, Therapy, Theology, Cambridge University Press, 2000
 Using the Bible in Christian Ministry, With Margaret Cooling and Trevor Cooling, Darton, Longman and Todd, 2007
 The Challenge of Practical Theology: Selected Essays, Jessica Kingsley, 2007
 Seeing Things: Deepening Relations with Visual Artefacts, SCM Press, 2007
 The SCM Study Guide to Theological Reflection, With Judith Thompson and Ross Thompson, SCM Press, 2008
 Emerging Values in Health Care, Ed. with Ben Hannigan, Roisin Pill and Huw Thomas, Jessica Kingsley, 2010
 Understanding Muslim Chaplaincy, With Sophie Gilliat-Ray and Mansur Ali, Ashgate, 2013
 Saving Face: Enfacement, Shame, Theology, Ashgate, 2013
 Invitation to Research in Practical Theology, With Zoë Bennett, Elaine Graham and Heather Walton, Routledge, 2018

References

External links
Stephen Pattison at the University of Birmingham

21st-century British philosophers
Philosophy academics
Living people
1953 births
Academics of the University of Birmingham
Philosophers of religion
21st-century British theologians
Alumni of the University of Edinburgh
Alumni of the University of Birmingham
Alumni of the University of Cambridge